Sonbolabad (also Romanized as Sonbolābād and Sanbalabad) is a village in Sonbolabad Rural District, Soltaniyeh District, Abhar County, Zanjan Province, Iran. At the 2006 census, its population was 772, in 191 families.

References 

Populated places in Abhar County